Vita e pensiero is the publishing house of the Università Cattolica del Sacro Cuore.

History
Vita e pensiero was founded in 1918 and the owner is Giuseppe Toniolo Institute for Advanced Studies. The name of university's publisher derives from the homonymous journal Vita e pensiero founded and directed by Agostino Gemelli and other Catholic intellectuals in 1914.

Magazines
The publishing house publishes several research and cultural journals. The main magazine is Vita e pensiero, which is the official magazine of the University. In addition to it are published:
Aegyptus
Aevum
Aevum Antiquum
Annali di storia moderna e contemporanea
Arte lombarda
Bollettino dell'archivio per la storia del movimento sociale cattolico in Italia.
Communicative business
Comunicazioni sociali
Comunicazioni sociali online
Jus
La rivista del clero italiano
Politiche sociali e servizi
Rivista d filosofia neo-scolastica
Rivista di storia della chiesa in Italia
Rivista internazionale di sciente sociali
Statistica e applicazioni
Studi di sociologia

References

External links
 Official website

Università Cattolica del Sacro Cuore
University presses of Italy
Mass media in Milan